Vilankulo F.C., short name VFC and better known under the name ENH de Vilankulos, is a Mozambican football (soccer) club based in Vilankulo that plays in the top division of Mozambican football, Moçambola.

References

External links
 

Football clubs in Mozambique
Association football clubs established in 2004
2004 establishments in Mozambique